John Hartley Williams (7 February 1942 – 3 May 2014) was an English poet who was born in Cheshire and grew up in London. He studied at the University of Nottingham and later at the University of London. His 2004 poetry book, Blues, was shortlisted for the T. S. Eliot Prize. He was a judge of the 2007 Poetry on the Lake poetry competition, a judge of the Keats-Shelley Prize for Poetry, and a tutor at the Arvon Foundation. He died from cancer at his home in Berlin in May 2014. He was survived by Gizella, his wife of 44 years, and their daughter.

Bibliography 

Hidden Identities. Chatto & Windus (1982) in the Phoenix Living Poets series
Bright River Yonder
Cornerless People
Double
Ignoble Sentiments
Canada
Spending Time with Walter
Mystery in Spiderville
Teach Yourself Writing Poetry. Teach Yourself Books, 2003
North Sea Improvisation. Privately printed, limited edition, Berlin, 2003
Blues.  Cape Poetry, 2004
The Ship. Salt Publishing, 2007
Café des Artistes. Cape Poetry, 2009

References 

Deaths from cancer in Germany
English male poets
20th-century English poets
20th-century English male writers
21st-century English poets
21st-century English male writers
Alumni of the University of Nottingham
Alumni of the University of London
1942 births
2014 deaths